Bukit Kerang is an archaeological site of the Mesolithic era found in the Aceh Tamiang Regency, Aceh, Eastern Sumatra, Indonesia.

The site stretches for about 120 kilometres to Tembung, a part of Medan in North Sumatra, in the southern part of the Aceh Tamiang regency. Two sites have been identified by the Archaeological Center of Medan (Balai Arkeologi Medan). For thousand of years the site has drawn farther and farther away from the coast. The site's distance from coast now is about 10 to 15 kilometres. The archaeologists who first researched the site were Dutch archaeologists in the 1920s to 1930s.

The prehistoric site was named "Bukit Kerang", meaning "hill of mollusk shells". The most significant part of it is a large shell mound, formed from a mass of mollusk shells. Prehistoric man of the Mesolithic era (dating from 5000 to 7000 years ago) lived by the shore of eastern Sumatra and mollusks were the easiest foodstuff that could be found. A pile of waste mollusk shells built up over time. There were also skulls, brainpans and bones which have been found inside the site. One of the skulls had teeth made of hematite.

References

External links 
 https://web.archive.org/web/20070502210749/http://kompas.com/ver1/Iptek/0704/03/172801.htm
 https://web.archive.org/web/20070916015812/http://www.tempointeraktif.com/hg/iptek/2007/04/13/brk%2C20070413-97804%2Cid.html

Archaeological cultures of Southeast Asia
Mesolithic cultures of Asia
Archaeological sites in Indonesia
Former populated places in Indonesia
Shell middens
Prehistoric Indonesia